Group A of the 1999 FIFA Women's World Cup took place from June 19 to 27, 1999. The group consisted of Denmark, Nigeria, North Korea and the hosts United States.

Standings

Matches
All times listed are local time.

United States vs Denmark

North Korea vs Nigeria

United States vs Nigeria

North Korea vs Denmark

Nigeria vs Denmark

United States vs North Korea

References

External links
FIFA Women's World Cup USA 1999 at FIFA.com

1999 FIFA Women's World Cup
Denmark at the 1999 FIFA Women's World Cup
Nigeria at the 1999 FIFA Women's World Cup
North Korea at the 1999 FIFA Women's World Cup
United States at the 1999 FIFA Women's World Cup